Paul Albert Bissonnette (born March 11, 1985), nicknamed "Biz Nasty", is a Canadian former professional ice hockey player who played in the National Hockey League (NHL) for the Pittsburgh Penguins and Phoenix Coyotes.

Bissonnette is currently a studio analyst for NHL on TNT, the color analyst for the Arizona Coyotes radio and a co-host along side former NHL defenseman  Ryan Whitney on the Barstool Sports hockey podcast Spittin' Chiclets.

Early life
Paul Albert Bissonnette was born March 11, 1985, in Welland, Ontario, to parents Yolande and Cam Bissonnette. Paul's mother was an office administration professor at Niagara College for 30 years in Southern Ontario. His father was a steel worker. Paul is French-Canadian, having attended French speaking schools until he was in the 7th grade, and biracial, as his mother is half black. Bissonnette is a fan of the Toronto Maple Leafs, both prior to his professional career and since retirement.

At age 16, Bissonnette was drafted 31st overall by the Ontario Hockey League (OHL)'s North Bay Centennials in the 2001 OHL Priority Selection. He played in 57 games as a rookie and scored three goals and three assists. Following the 2001–02 season, the Centennials relocated and became the Saginaw Spirit.

Bissonnette was named co-captain on the Spirit and also became a member of Canada's under-18 gold medal-winning team. During the 2003 Home Hardware Top Prospects Game, Bissonnette was named Team Orr player of the game after recording a goal and fighting Dion Phaneuf.

Playing career

Early career
Bissonnette was selected in the fourth round, 121st overall, of the 2003 NHL Entry Draft by the Pittsburgh Penguins. When drafted, he was playing with the Saginaw Spirit of the junior OHL. During the 2003–04 season, Bissonnette served as the Spirit captain and finished ninth in points. He played another half season with the Spirit before being traded to the Owen Sound Attack, where he finished the 2004–05 season.

Professional career

Pittsburgh Penguins
Bissonnette began his professional career in 2005 with the Wheeling Nailers of the ECHL. He appeared in 14 games for the Nailers, while also playing 55 games with the Wilkes-Barre/Scranton Penguins of the American Hockey League (AHL). On November 12, 2005, Bissonnette received his first professional fighting major when he fought Jordan Smith of the Portland Pirates. The following season, Bissonnette played 65 games with the Nailers, while spending three with the Penguins. Bissonnette scored his first professional goal in the AHL on February 25, 2006, on goaltender Maxime Ouellet of the Manitoba Moose. The following season, Bissonnette appeared in 65 games for the Nailers, while only skating in three for the Penguins. After 22 games with the Nailers during the 2007–08 season, Bissonnette was recalled by the Penguins, where he would spend the remainder of the season. While in Wilkes-Barre/Scranton, teammates Dennis Bonvie and Deryk Engelland worked with Bissonnette, often practising fighting techniques. During his time in Wheeling, he was also named to the ECHL all-star game twice.

Bissonnette earned a spot on the Pittsburgh Penguins' roster to begin the 2008–09 season. He earned his first NHL fighting major on October 16, 2008, when he fought Matt Bradley of the Washington Capitals. During the fight, Bissonnette knocked Bradley to the ice, bloodying his nose. On January 13, 2009, Bissonnette recorded his first career NHL point, assisting on a goal by Tyler Kennedy against the Philadelphia Flyers.

On May 5, 2009, during a playoff game between the Wilkes-Barre/Scranton Penguins and the Hershey Bears, Bissonnette was hit awkwardly by Greg Amadio and Steve Pinizzotto. He was deeply cut by the skate of one of the Hershey players on his left wrist and suffered nerve damage in his left hand.

Phoenix/Arizona Coyotes
On October 1, 2009, Bissonnette was claimed on waivers by the Phoenix Coyotes after failing to make the Penguins' NHL roster out of training camp. On October 12, 2009, Bissonnette's first fight as a Coyote occurred against Jody Shelley of the San Jose Sharks. On November 12, 2009, Bissonnette scored his first NHL goal, against goaltender Carey Price of the Montreal Canadiens in a 4–2 loss.

On October 5, 2011, Bissonnette signed a two-year contract extension with the Coyotes. During the 2011–12 season, on November 19, 2011, Bissonnette scored the game-winning goal, playing in front of his mother and grandparents for the first time as an NHL player. The Coyotes went on to win 4–2 over the Buffalo Sabres.

With the 2012–13 NHL lock-out in effect, on November 1, 2012, Bissonnette signed with the Cardiff Devils of the British Elite Ice Hockey League (EIHL). In ten games for the Devils, Bissonnette scored 6 goals and 19 points before returning to the Coyotes.

Various teams
Bissonnette left the Coyotes' organization after five seasons following the 2013–14 season. On September 16, 2014, he accepted a tryout agreement from the St. Louis Blues to attend their training camp. After playing the entirety of the pre-season, Bissonnette was released from his tryout on October 4.

A few weeks later, on October 24, Bissonnette returned to the Cardiff Devils of the EIHL. He re-joined the team "on a temporary basis while he still looks for opportunities in the NHL". Bissonnette returned to the Coyotes' organization just three days later on October 27 when he signed a professional tryout agreement with the club's AHL affiliate, the Portland Pirates. After just eight games, Bissonnette was released from his tryout on December 9.

Manchester Monarchs/Ontario Reign
On the same day, Bissonnette signed a tryout agreement with the Manchester Monarchs, the AHL affiliate of the Los Angeles Kings. After 19 games, on February 3, 2015, the Monarchs signed Bissonnette to a standard AHL contract for the remainder of the season. Bissonnette and the Monarchs won the Calder Cup after defeating the Utica Comets in five games.

With the Monarchs joining the ECHL, the team was replaced by the Ontario Reign as the Kings' AHL affiliate. On July 8, 2015, the Reign signed Bissonnette to a one-year contract. He played 35 games for the team during the 2015–16 season. On July 6, 2016, he returned to the Reign after signing a one-year extension.

Post-playing career
On June 24, 2017, it was announced that Bissonnette would join the Coyotes' radio booth as a color commentator, replacing Nick Boynton. On September 7, Bissonnette officially confirmed his retirement from professional hockey on his Instagram account.

On April 11, 2018, Bissonnette was announced as a new member of the Barstool Sports' hockey podcast, Spittin' Chiclets, joining former Penguins' teammate Ryan Whitney.

On May 14, 2018, Bissonnette released a mockumentary series named BizNasty Does BC, which he co-created with Pasha Eshghi. The series features 17 past and present NHL stars and shows off the beauty of the province of British Columbia.

In February 2019, Bissonnette partnered with CaniBrands, a CBD health and wellness company as the company's Sports and Media Ambassador.

In 2021, Turner Sports announced that Bissonnette would be joining the company as a pregame and intermission analyst for the NHL on TNT, alongside Wayne Gretzky, Anson Carter, and Rick Tocchet.

Career statistics

Regular season and playoffs

International

Awards and honours

References

External links

 
 

1985 births
Living people
Canadian ice hockey defencemen
Canadian people of American descent
Cardiff Devils players
Ice hockey people from Ontario
Manchester Monarchs (AHL) players
North Bay Centennials players
Ontario Reign (AHL) players
Owen Sound Attack players
Phoenix Coyotes players
Pittsburgh Penguins draft picks
Pittsburgh Penguins players
Portland Pirates players
Saginaw Spirit players
Sportspeople from Welland
Wheeling Nailers players
Wilkes-Barre/Scranton Penguins players
Canadian expatriate ice hockey players in the United States
Canadian expatriate ice hockey players in Wales
Francophone Canadians
Barstool Sports people